Emma Rickards (born 17 November 1973) is a road cyclist from Australia. She represented her nation at the 2006, 2007 and 2008 UCI Road World Championships.

References

External links
 profile at Procyclingstats.com

1973 births
Australian female cyclists
Living people
Place of birth missing (living people)